Rye House railway station is on the Hertford East branch line off the West Anglia Main Line in the east of England, serving the Rye House area of Hoddesdon, Hertfordshire. Its three-letter station code is RYH.

The station and all trains calling are operated by Greater Anglia.

Services
The typical Monday-Saturday off-peak service is two trains per hour to London Liverpool Street via Tottenham Hale, and two trains per hour to Hertford East.

The typical peak service towards London is three trains per hour, two of which are for Liverpool Street via Seven Sisters and one is for Stratford via Tottenham Hale.

The typical service on a Sunday is two trains per hour to Stratford via Tottenham Hale.

Services are generally formed of Class 317 trains and Class 379s

Oyster cards are accepted at the station.

References

External links

Hoddesdon
Railway stations in Hertfordshire
DfT Category E stations
Former Great Eastern Railway stations
Railway stations in Great Britain opened in 1843
Greater Anglia franchise railway stations
1843 establishments in England